Polyrhaphis angustata is a species of beetle in the family Cerambycidae. It was described by Buquet in 1853. It is known from Colombia, Nicaragua, Costa Rica, French Guiana, Brazil, Panama, Ecuador, and Peru.

References

Polyrhaphidini
Beetles described in 1853